Dinis Martins Vital (2 July 1932 – 16 September 2014) was a Portuguese footballer who played as goalkeeper.

Vital gained 1 cap for Portugal against Switzerland 16 May 1959 in Geneva, in a 3-4 defeat.

He is the 4th player with most games played in the Portuguese League only behind João Vieira Pinto, António Sousa and Manuel Fernandes.

Vital died on the 17 September 2014 at the age of 82 in Évora.

References

External links 
 
 

1932 births
2014 deaths
People from Grândola
Portuguese footballers
Association football goalkeepers
Primeira Liga players
Lusitano G.C. players
Vitória F.C. players
Juventude Sport Clube players
União Montemor players
Portugal international footballers
Portugal B international footballers
Portuguese football managers
Primeira Liga managers
Juventude Sport Clube managers
G.C. Alcobaça managers
S.C. Farense managers
Sportspeople from Setúbal District